The Air Creation Tanarg is a French ultralight trike, designed and produced by Air Creation of Aubenas. The aircraft is supplied as complete ready-to-fly-aircraft. In the United Kingdom the Tanarg is amateur-built from kits supplied by Air Creation.

Design and development

It is also an accepted Special Light-Sport Aircraft in the United States. The Tanarg features a cable-braced hang glider-style high-wing, weight-shift controls, a two-seats-in-tandem, open cockpit, tricycle landing gear with wheel pants and a single engine in pusher configuration.

The aircraft is made from mixed constriction, with bolted-together aluminum tubing, composites and carbon fibre panels, with its double surface wing covered in Dacron sailcloth. With the BioniX wing it has a  span that is supported by a single tube-type kingpost and uses an "A" frame weight-shift control bar. The powerplant options include the twin cylinder, liquid-cooled, two-stroke, dual-ignition  Rotax 582 engine and  the four cylinder, air and liquid-cooled, four-stroke, dual-ignition  Rotax 912UL and  Rotax 912ULS engines.

A number of different wings can be fitted to the basic trike, including the Air Creation iXess, Air Creation Nuvix, Air Creation Fun and Air Creation BioniX.

Specifications (Tanarg 912 trike with a BioniX 15 wing)

References

External links

2000s French sport aircraft
2000s French ultralight aircraft
Single-engined pusher aircraft
Ultralight trikes
Homebuilt aircraft
Tanarg